The name Ewiniar has been used to name four tropical cyclones in the Western Pacific Ocean. The name was submitted by the Federated States of Micronesia and is the name of a Chuukese storm God.

 Typhoon Ewiniar (2000) (T0009, 15W)
 Typhoon Ewiniar (2006) (T0603, 04W, Ester)
 Severe Tropical Storm Ewiniar (2012) (T1218, 19W)
 Tropical Storm Ewiniar (2018) (T1804, 05W)

Pacific typhoon set index articles